Darrell Keith Miller Sr. (born February 26, 1958) is an American former professional baseball player. While with the Los Angeles Angels, he was a catcher and outfielder, playing from 1985 to 1988. He is also a Catholic deacon, the first African American ordained in the Diocese of Orange.

As of 2021, he serves as the director of Major League Baseball's Urban Youth Academy, located in Compton, California.

Career 
Before being drafted to the Major League Baseball (MLB), he played three seasons at California State Polytechnic University in Pomona, California.

He played his entire career for the California Angels, the team that drafted him in the 9th round of the 1979 Major League Baseball Draft. He played in 224 career MLB games, batting .241 with 13 doubles, 8 home runs, and 35 runs batted in, in 394 at-bats.

As a member of the team in 1986, the Angels advanced to the American League Championship Series, losing to the Boston Red Sox.

Personal life
Miller is the brother of Basketball Hall of Fame members Cheryl Miller and Reggie Miller. He attended Ramona High School in Riverside, California in the mid 1970s. He is married to Kelly Miller and has three children; Darrell Jr., Nicole and Cameron.

Miller converted to Catholicism after unsuccessfully attempting to convert Kelly to his former Baptist faith. He became a Catholic deacon in October 2021, the first African American ordained to that office in the Diocese of Orange.

References

External links
, or Retrosheet, or Pura Pelota (Venezuelan Winter League)

1958 births
Living people
African-American baseball players
African-American Catholics
American expatriate baseball players in Canada
Anaheim Angels scouts
Baseball players from Washington, D.C.
Cal Poly Pomona Broncos baseball players
Calgary Cannons players
California Angels players
California Angels scouts
Catholics from California
Catholics from Washington, D.C.
Columbus Clippers players
Converts to Roman Catholicism from Baptist denominations
Edmonton Trappers players
Holyoke Millers players
Idaho Falls Angels players
Major League Baseball catchers
Rochester Red Wings players
Salinas Angels players
Salt Lake City Gulls players
Tiburones de La Guaira players
American expatriate baseball players in Venezuela
Tigres de Aragua players
21st-century African-American people
20th-century African-American sportspeople
American Roman Catholic deacons
Riverside Polytechnic High School alumni